The 1947–48 season was the 46th in the history of the Western Football League.

The champions for the third time in their history and for the second consecutive season were Trowbridge Town, and the winners of Division Two were new club Salisbury, formed after the previous Salisbury club disbanded.

Two games in each division were left unplayed at the end of the season, and were ignored.

Division One
Division One remained at eighteen members with two clubs promoted to replace Frome Town and Welton Rovers, who were relegated to Division Two.

Clandown, champions of Division Two
Soundwell, runners-up in Division Two

Division Two
Division Two was increased from thirteen to eighteen clubs, after Clandown and Soundwell were promoted to Division One, and Thorney Pitts disbanded. Eight new clubs joined:

Cheltenham Town Reserves
Dorchester Town
Frome Town, relegated from Division One.
National Smelting Company
Salisbury
Stonehouse
Welton Rovers, relegated from Division One.
Weymouth, rejoining after leaving the league in 1939.

References

1947-48
4